Teucrium micranthum is a species of flowering plant in the family Lamiaceae, and is endemic to a restricted area of Queensland. It is an erect subshrub with small, aromatic, egg-shaped to elliptic leaves and small white flowers.

Description
The flowers are arranged in groups of between four and twenty, each flower in a leaf axil.

Taxonomy
Teucrium micranthum was first formally described in 2002 by Barry Conn in the journal Telopea from specimens collected in Carnarvon National Park in 1999. The specific epithet (micranthum) refers to the small petals of this species.

Distribution and habitat
This germander grows in woodland and forest with brigalow and Eucalyptus species between Springsure and Charleville in the North Kennedy and Leichhardt botanical districts of Queensland.

Conservation status
Teucrium micranthum is listed as of "least concern" under the Queensland Government Nature Conservation Act 1992.

References

micranthum
Lamiales of Australia
Flora of Queensland
Plants described in 2002
Taxa named by Barry John Conn